Tetragonoderus quadrisignatus is a species of beetle in the family Carabidae. It was described by Quensel In Schonherr in 1806.

References

quadrisignatus
Beetles described in 1806